Joséphine Mbarga-Bikié (born 3 April 1979) is a Cameroonian long jumper.

Achievements

External links

1979 births
Living people
Cameroonian female long jumpers
Competitors at the 2005 Summer Universiade
Competitors at the 2003 Summer Universiade
Athletes (track and field) at the 2007 All-Africa Games
African Games competitors for Cameroon
21st-century Cameroonian women